Aculnahuacatl Tzaqualcatl (ruled c. 1400–c. 1430) was the first tlatoani (ruler) of the pre-Columbian Tepanec altepetl (ethnic state) of Tlacopan in the Valley of Mexico.

Aculnahuacatl was a son of Tezozomoc, the ruler of Azcapotzalco, who installed him as ruler of Tlacopan. He married Tlacochcuetzin, the daughter of Tlacacuitlahuatzin, the ruler of Tiliuhcan, and had two sons: Coauoxtli and Oquetzal.

"Acolnahuacatl" was part of an anti-Mexica coalition to drive the then-nomadic tribe off or exterminate them.

Notes

References

1430 deaths
14th-century births
Tlatoque

Year of birth unknown